Ronald Ramón (born January 14, 1986) is a Dominican basketball coach and retired player who is currently an assistant coach for the Fordham Rams. He last played for Flamengo of the Novo Basquete Brasil (NBB) and the Dominican national team, where he participated at the 2014 FIBA Basketball World Cup.

The Basketball Tournament (TBT)
In the summer of 2017, Ramón competed in The Basketball Tournament on ESPN for Zoo Crew which was a team composed of University of Pittsburgh basketball alum. Competing for the $2 million grand prize, Ramón scored seven points and dished out two assists in 30 minutes as Zoo Crew fell in the first-round 100-87 to the Sideline Cancer.

Coaching career
In 2019, Pitt head coach Jeff Capel hired Ramón as an assistant for basketball operations. He served in that role until spring of 2021, when he was hired as an assistant coach at Fordham under new head coach Kyle Neptune.

College career

College statistics

|-
| align="left" | 2004–05
| align="left" | Pittsburgh
| 28 || 9 || 26.1 || .363 || .336 || .774 || 1.7 || 1.9 || .9 || .0 || 6.8
|-
| align="left" | 2005–06
| align="left" | Pittsburgh
| 33 || 27 || 24.9 || .463 || .415 || .831 || 1.4 || 2.2 || .7 || .0 || 8.0
|-
| align="left" | 2006–07
| align="left" | Pittsburgh
| 37 || 0 || 23.9 || .464 || .451 || .868 || 1.8 || 2.2 || .5 || .1 || 8.8
|-
| align="left" | 2007–08
| align="left" | Pittsburgh
| 37 || 37 || 31.8 || .388 || .372 || .710 || 2.6 || 3.6 || 1.0 || .1 || 8.5
|-
| Career ||  || 135 || 73 || 26.8 || .418 || .395 || .801 || 1.9 || 2.5 || .8 || .0 || 8.1

Career statistics

NBB regular season

NBB playoffs

References

External links
NBB Player Profile

1986 births
Living people
Associação Limeirense de Basquete players
Club Atlético Tabaré basketball players
Dominican Republic men's basketball players
Dominican Republic expatriate basketball people in Brazil
Flamengo basketball players
Lanús basketball players
Novo Basquete Brasil players
Point guards
Shooting guards
2014 FIBA Basketball World Cup players
2019 FIBA Basketball World Cup players